William Richardson FRSE (1 October 1743 – 3 November 1814) was a Scottish classicist and literary scholar. In 1783 he was a joint founder of the Royal Society of Edinburgh.

Life
Born in Aberfoyle, Perthshire, he was the son of Rev. James Richardson, the Church of Scotland parish minister of the same parish in which William was first educated. William attended the University of Glasgow in 1757 where he focused on his talent for learning languages. He graduated MA from the University in 1763 and was employed by Charles Cathcart, 9th Lord Cathcart, as tutor to his two sons. 

William travelled to Russia with the Cathcart family, after Lord Cathcart was appointed ambassador to Russia in 1768. It was during these travels that Richardson described Russia through a series of letters. He later had them published, in 1784, under the title Anecdotes of the Russian Empire; in a series of letters, written, a few years ago, from St. Petersburg. These letters would later go down as a very accurate detail of Russian society.

After returning to Scotland in 1772, Richardson was appointed professor of humanities at the University of Glasgow in 1773. With the ability to attract many great scholars, and also being a very popular lecturer, Glasgow became a prestigious institution. Richardson would also publish five works criticizing Shakespeare. Richardson was very interested in not only English literature, but he also read German, Italian, and French literature.

He died a single man in his lodgings at Glasgow University.

Archives
The archives for William Richardson are maintained by the  Archives of the University of Glasgow (GUAS).

References 

Attribution

Sources
 

Academics of the University of Glasgow
1743 births
1814 deaths
Writers about Russia
People from Stirling (council area)
Scottish classical scholars
Scottish literary critics
Founder Fellows of the Royal Society of Edinburgh
Alumni of the University of Glasgow
Scottish travel writers
Historians of Russia
Scottish linguists
People of the Scottish Enlightenment